Mister G (Ben Gundersheimer) is a Latin GRAMMY musician, author, and educator. He has released ten award-winning albums of original music for children and families, including four bilingual (Spanish/English). His 2015 bilingual release, Los Animales, won the Latin GRAMMY award for Best Children's album. Five of his albums (Chocolalala, Los Animales, The Mitzvah Bus, Mundo Verde/Green World, Fireflies) have won the Parents' Choice Gold Award.  ABC Fiesta (2014) received a Latin GRAMMY nomination. His CDs have been selected as best children's albums of the year by People Magazine, Parents Magazine, and The Washington Post.

History 
Born and raised in Philadelphia, Pennsylvania, Mister G (Ben Gundersheimer) is the son of noted children's book author and illustrator Karen Gundersheimer.  Ben is a graduate of Amherst College, and the recipient of the first songwriting scholarship awarded by the Berklee College of Music. As an adult-oriented singer-songwriter, he performed and toured internationally. For his Master's thesis at Smith College, Ben created a curriculum that incorporated song-writing as a learning tool. His 4th grade students dubbed him ‘Mister G’, and while teaching at the Smith College Campus School, he began writing the songs that would comprise his debut family album.

Musician 

Mister G's 2010 debut children's music release, Pizza for Breakfast, was inspired by his former elementary school students at the Smith College Campus School.

BUGS, released in 2011, received awards from the Parents' Choice Foundation and the National Parenting Publications. The album was also chosen as one of the top ten best children’s albums of 2011 by Parents Magazine and People Magazine.

Mister G's two bilingual albums, "Chocolalala" (2012) and "ABC Fiesta" (2013) were inspired by his concert tours throughout Latin America, and feature the voices of bilingual families.

Released in 2014, The Bossy E is Mister G's literacy-themed album, which features a variety of genres, and received a NAPPA Award. GRAMMY winning saxophonist Charles Neville (Neville Brothers) and Senegalese talking drum master Massamba Diop (Baaba Maal) both perform on the album.

For his GRAMMY winning album, Los Animales (2015), MISTER G collaborated with many leading figures from the Latin music world including Arturo O'Farrill, Oscar Stagnaro, Marlow Rosado, Vince Cherico, and Robby Ameen.

Drawing from an eclectic range of musical influences, The Mitzvah Bus (2015), Mister G's Jewish-themed album, spans genres from funk to folk and rock to ska, while the lyrics celebrate family, holidays, food, camp and language.

Mundo Verde/Green World (2017) is a collection of original, bilingual children's songs with an environmental theme.

Mister G returns to his roots with Americana release, FIREFLIES (2019).

The upcoming Seeds of Shalom (2020) is a collection of original, multicultural songs feature a wide range of styles (merengue, reggae, rock, folk, bossa nova, salsa) and languages (English, Hebrew, Spanish and Yiddish). The album has a theme of peace and unity across borders and cultures.

All of Mister G's albums are written, produced, recorded and mixed by Ben Gundersheimer. Mister G tours internationally, headlining venues such as Symphony Space in New York, The National Zoo in Washington DC, The Hard Rock Cafe in Philadelphia, The Getty Museum in Los Angeles, The Coolidge Corner Theatre in Boston, among many others. Mister G also regularly conducts artists residencies in schools in the United States and Latin America.

Discography

Album 
 Seeds of Shalom (Coil Records) 2020
 Fireflies (Coil Records) 2019
 Mundo Verde/Green World (Coil Records) 2017
 The Mitzvah Bus (Coil Records) 2015
 Los Animales (Coil Records) 2015
 The Bossy E (Coil Records) 2014
 ABC Fiesta (Coil Records) 2013
 Chocolalala (Coil Records) 2012
 BUGS (Coil Records) 2011
 Pizza for Breakfast (Coil Records) 2010

Videography

Author 
MISTER G has written two picture books based on his original songs. Both Señorita Mariposa and Lilah Tov/Good Night were published by Penguin Random House.

Señorita Mariposa

The idea was born in 2017 when Ben sent the lyrics of his bilingual song Señorita Mariposa to Marcos Almada Rivero, a revered Mexican illustrator living in Oaxaca. The pair had become fast friends after collaborating on the artwork for Ben's Latin GRAMMY Award-winning album, Los Animales (2015), and were excited to reimagine the song as a picture book. As the project unfolded, the national dialogue about immigration and climate change intensified, emphasizing the symbolic importance of their cross-border collaboration.

Lilah Tov/Good Night

Based on a lullaby, Lilah Tov Good Night depicts the journey of a young girl as she leaves home with her family in search of a better life in a new land. Illustrated by Israeli artist, Noar Lee Haggon, this lyrical lullaby celebrates the beauty of our world and the spirit of resilience in a refugee family.

Activist 

Mister G performed at the National Climate Rally in Washington, D.C. He has headlined four concerts on Capitol Hill for children and families from all fifty states in his role as an advocate for Moms Clean Air Force. Two of Mister G's albums (Mundo Verde/Green World and Seeds of Shalom) have explicit environmental themes, as does his picture book (Señorita Mariposa) which is about the monarch butterfly migration.

Educator 
Mister G has performed concerts and led workshops at schools around the US and in many other countries (Mexico, India, England, Dominican Republic, Guatemala). He also leads professional development programs for educators.

A graduate of Amherst College, Ben received a songwriting scholarship to Berklee College of Music. He was awarded a full fellowship for his Master of Education degree. Ben taught at the Smith College Campus School in Northampton, MA.

References

External links 
 Official Mister G website
 Mister G's YouTube
 Mister G's Facebook
 "ONE TRACK MIND: Mister G <Gonna Take My Hat>" by Jeff, OWTK KID's MUSIC NEWS

Living people
American children's entertainers
Spanish-language singers of the United States
Latin Grammy Award winners
Year of birth missing (living people)